The Chery A11, also known as Fulwin, Fengyun or Windcloud, is Chery's first car. Created without government approval, it has nonetheless been the first step of Chery's success story and helped transform the Chinese automotive market from one dependent on foreign joint ventures.

Development
The A11 is essentially a rebadged first generation SEAT Toledo, a model which was built by SEAT – i.e. the Spanish subsidiary of the Volkswagen group – from 1991 to 1998 and was based on the Volkswagen Group A2 platform. This is the same platform used by FAW-VW Automobile for their successful, license-built FAW-VW Jetta. Windcloud production indeed depended on secret side deals with the same parts suppliers as did FAW-VW. A later financial settlement out of court meant that Volkswagen agreed to abstain from a planned lawsuit. The purchase of the Toledo blueprints was also executed in secret, in spite of SEAT being a Volkswagen subsidiary: all of these deft negotiations were the work of engineer Yin Tongyao, who had originally worked for Volkswagen's Chinese joint venture.

Tongyao was originally poached by the government of Wuhu, in Anhui province, after they had reached the decision to develop a car for local production. Tongyao had also quietly purchased the production line for a rather outdated Ford engine (Ford 1.6 CVH) in England, which he then transferred to Anhui: the first engines left the production line in May 1999. This was to be the first engine installed in the Windcloud. It was later replaced by the more modern Tritec and Acteco engines. At the time, China had very strict regulations hindering the entry of new players into the automotive industry, so for nearly two years Chery was officially only producing "automotive components", albeit in a fully assembled form. In 2001, Chery finally received government permission to market their cars nationwide.

The Chery A11's production began in December 1999 as the CAC6340. The name was changed to Fengyun, codenamed SQR7160, in 2000, and Chinese production ended in 2006. The Chery A15, first presented in 2003, is a facelifted Windcloud.

References

External links

A11
Sedans
Subcompact cars
First car made by manufacturer